Ionești may refer to several places in Romania:

 Ionești, Gorj, a commune in Gorj County
 Ionești, Vâlcea, a commune in Vâlcea County
 Ionești, a village in Hălmagiu Commune, Arad County
 Ionești, a village in Buzoești Commune, Argeș County
 Ionești, a village in Cireșu Commune, Brăila County
 Ionești, a village in Cața Commune, Brașov County
 Ionești, a village in Petrești Commune, Dâmbovița County

See also 
 Ion (name)
 Ionășeni (disambiguation)